Anotherland is a 2008 album by New Zealand singer-songwriter Dave Dobbyn. It was recorded in England with producer Adrian Sherwood and musician 'Little Axe' Skip McDonald. The album debuted at number 2 on the New Zealand Music Charts and was later certified Gold.

Background
Dobbyn was put in contact with Sherwood and McDonald through his manager Lorraine Barry, who had been based in the UK before moving to New Zealand and knew Sherwood well. They were introduced at a Dobbyn gig in London. Dobbyn recorded the album in London over three weeks with his touring band.

Track listing

Critical reception
Critical reception was generally favourable, with praise given to Dobbyn for moving away from his usual rock roots towards dubstep. Tony Parker of NZ Musician commented that through "unlikely pairing with Sherwood [Dobbyn] has taken the best of what he does and moulded it into something new." Fairfax gave more muted praise, as they saw the mixed results as being "a missed opportunity".

References

External links
 Access All Areas: Dave Dobbyn andAdrian Sherwood, Radio New Zealand interview

Dave Dobbyn albums
2008 albums